(Charles) Stewart Macpherson (29 March 1865 – 27 March 1941) was an English musician of Scottish descent. He was born in Liverpool, and studied at the Royal Academy of Music in London. He was a student of the composer Walter Cecil Macfarren. In 1887, he joined the RAM staff, and taught harmony and composition. He founded the Music Teachers' Association in 1908, and was its chairman until 1923. From 1925 to 1927, he was dean of the Faculty of Music in the University of London.  His notable students included violinist John Waterhouse and violinist and composer Susan Spain-Dunk.

Macpherson was primarily a music educator, and is remembered for such textbooks as Practical Harmony (1894), Form in Music (1908), and Melody and Harmony (1920  Also a composer, pianist and choral and orchestral conductor in his earlier years, Macpherson wrote a Symphony in C (1880), a Mass in D (1898), and a Concerto alla fantasia for violin and orchestra (1904). He was appointed conductor of the Westminster Orchestral Society in 1885, a post he remained in for several years.

He died in London on 27 March 1941.

Writings
Practical Harmony (1894)
Practical Counterpoint (1900)
The Rudiments of Music (1903)
Questions and Exercises upon the Rudiments of Music (1907)
Form in Music (1908)
Music and its Appreciation (1910)
The Appreciative Aspects of Music-Study (1910)
Studies in Phrasing and Form (1911)
Modern Ideas in the Teaching of Harmony (1912)
Aural Culture based upon Musical Appreciation (1912–21, with E. Read)
Ear-Training and the Teaching of the Minor Mode (1913)
The Musical Education of the Child (1915)
Melody and Harmony (1920)
The Appreciation Class (1923)
Studies in the Art of Counterpoint (1928)
A Simple Introduction to the Principles of Tonality (1929)
A Commentary on … the Forty-Eight Preludes and Fugues (Das Wohltemperirte Klavier) of Johann Sebastian Bach (1934–7)
Cameos of Musical History (1937)

References

1865 births
1941 deaths
British music educators
English composers
Alumni of the Royal Academy of Music
Musicians from Liverpool